Ruloe House is a country house  east of Norley, Cheshire, England.  It was built in about 1873 for the Wilbraham estate, and designed by the Chester architect John Douglas.  It is constructed in red brick and has red tiled roofs.  The house is decorated with strip pilasters.  It is in two storeys, with a four-bay south front.  On its garden side is a circular turret with a conical roof.  The house is recorded in the National Heritage List for England as a designated Grade II listed building.

See also

Listed buildings in Crowton
List of houses and associated buildings by John Douglas

References

Grade II listed buildings in Cheshire
Grade II listed houses
Country houses in Cheshire
John Douglas buildings